Sybil, or The Two Nations is an 1845 novel by Benjamin Disraeli. Published in the same year as Friedrich Engels's The Condition of the Working Class in England in 1844, Sybil traces the plight of the working classes of England. Disraeli was interested in dealing with the horrific conditions in which the majority of England's working classes lived — or, what is generally called the Condition of England question.

The book is a roman à thèse, or a novel with a thesis — which was meant to create a furor over the squalor that was plaguing England's working class cities.

Disraeli's novel was made into a silent film called Sybil in 1921, starring Evelyn Brent and Cowley Wright.

Disraeli's interest in this subject stemmed from his interest in the Chartist movement, a working-class political reformist movement that sought universal male suffrage and other parliamentary reforms. (Thomas Carlyle sums up the movement in his 1839 book Chartism.) Chartism failed as a parliamentary movement (three petitions to Parliament were rejected); however, five of the "Six Points" of Chartism would become a reality within a century of the group's formation.

Chartism demanded:
 Universal suffrage for men
 Secret ballot
 Removal of property requirements for Parliament
 Salaries for Members of Parliament (MPs)
 Equal electoral districts
 Annually elected Parliament

Characters
Sybil Gerard
Charles Egremont
Lord Marney
Lord Henry Sydney
Lord de Mowbray
Rigby
Taper
Tadpole
Lady St. Julians
Marchioness of Deloraine
Baptist Hatton
Aubrey St. Lys
Sidonia
Devilsdust
Dandy Mick
Walter Gerard (Sybil's father)
Stephen Morley
Mr. Mountchesney

See also

One Nation Conservatism
Coningsby (novel)
Tancred (novel)
The Difference Engine, a steampunk novel containing alternate versions of several characters from Sybil. It also features Disraeli himself as a character.

Bibliography

Editions
There is no critical edition of Disraeli's novels. Most editions use the text of Longmans Collected Edition (1870–71).
Disraeli, Benjamin Sybil. (Harmondsworth: Penguin, 1987) . Edited with an introduction by Rab Butler and notes by Thom Braun.
Disraeli, Benjamin Sybil. (Oxford: Oxford University Press, 1998) . Edited with an introduction and notes by Sheila Smith.

Works of criticism
Braun, Thom Disraeli The Novelist. (London: George Allen & Unwin, 1981) .

References

External links

 
 archive.org: 
 Vol I (1845)
 Vol II (1845)
 Vol III (1845)
 
 

1845 British novels
One-nation conservatism
British novels adapted into films
Novels by Benjamin Disraeli
British political novels
Victorian novels
Social novels
Books written by prime ministers of the United Kingdom